Holiday Ranch was a Canadian television country music–themed variety program airing on the CBC from 1953 to 1958. The show initially aired on weeknights then moved to a weekly Saturday night schedule before Hockey Night in Canada.

The set of the series was a ranch house and the plot featured a set of regulars who visited the ranch each week. The production cost was approximately $5000 per episode.

The show was considered among the most popular in 1950s Canadian television.

References 

CBC Television original programming
1950s Canadian variety television series
1953 Canadian television series debuts
1958 Canadian television series endings
Black-and-white Canadian television shows